This is a list of Finnish composers, organized by date of birth.

18th century

19th century

20th century

See also
 List of composers

Finnish

Composers